The grey-and-white tyrannulet (Pseudelaenia leucospodia) is a species of bird in the tyrant flycatcher family Tyrannidae. It is the only species placed in the genus Pseudelaenia. It is found in Ecuador and Peru, where natural habitats are subtropical or tropical dry shrubland and subtropical or tropical moist shrubland.

References

grey-and-white tyrannulet
Birds of Ecuador
Birds of Peru
Birds of the Tumbes-Chocó-Magdalena
grey-and-white tyrannulet
grey-and-white tyrannulet
Taxonomy articles created by Polbot